Arkansas Highway 66 (AR 66 and Hwy. 66) is an east–west state highway in north central Arkansas. The route of  runs from US Route 65 in Leslie east to AR 9 in Mountain View.

Route description

AR 66 begins in Leslie at US 65 near the American Legion Post No. 131 and runs past the Farmers Bank Building, the Dr. Clay House, and the Dr. Robinson House. The route winds east as a two–lane rural highway through Oxley to Highway 74. Further east, Highway 66 continues through Alco by the Alco School to intersect and briefly concur with Highway 263 at Timbo near the Jim Morris Barn. The highway winds past the Clarence Anderson Barn through Newnata to enter Mountain View. AR 66 serves as a terminus for Highway 87 and runs past the Brewer's Mill, the A. B. Brewer Building, and the C.L. Smith & Son General Store before terminating at Highway 9.

Major intersections

See also

References

External links

066
Transportation in Stone County, Arkansas
Transportation in Searcy County, Arkansas